Sei Rampah is a town in North Sumatra province of Indonesia and it is the seat (capital) of Serdang Bedagai Regency.

Populated places in North Sumatra
Regency seats of North Sumatra